Spencer Martin (born June 8, 1995) is a Canadian professional ice hockey goaltender for the Abbotsford Canucks of the American Hockey League (AHL) while under contract to the Vancouver Canucks in the National Hockey League (NHL). Martin was selected by the Colorado Avalanche in the third round, 63rd overall, in the 2013 NHL Entry Draft.

Playing career
An Ontario native, Martin played midget hockey with the Toronto Jr. Canadiens before he was originally selected 18th overall in the 2011 OHL Priority Selection by the Mississauga St. Michael's Majors, He made his debut in the 2011–12 season, appearing in 15 games in the last season that the team was known as the Majors. During the campaign Martin won a bronze medal with Team Ontario at the 2012 World U-17 Hockey Challenge, and was also a member of Canada's team at the 2012 IIHF World U18 Championships which won bronze in the Czech Republic.

With the renamed Mississauga Steelheads during the 2012–13 season, Martin was an invited participant at the 2013 CHL Top Prospects Game where he led Team Orr to a rare shutout win, and he helped Canada men's national under-18 ice hockey team win gold at the 2013 IIHF World U18 Championships. Leading up to the 2013 NHL Entry Draft. Martin was rated as a top prospect. He was the fifth goalie selected in the draft, when he was selected 63rd overall by the Colorado Avalanche.

In the 2013–14 season, Martin, playing in his second campaign as the Steelheads' first-choice goaltender, appeared in a league-high 64 games and 3562 minutes in posting 24 wins. In his final year of major junior hockey, Martin was signed by the Avalanche to a three-year, entry-level contract on October 5, 2014.

While playing in a career-high 50 games during the 2016–17 season, Martin was selected for the 2017 AHL All-Star Classic, the first and only Rampage goaltender to ever be selected. The same season, Martin made his NHL debut on January 21, 2017, in a 3–2 overtime loss to the San Jose Sharks. Due to the recalls by the Avalanche, Martin was unable to participate in the All-Star Classic. On July 16, 2018, Martin signed a one-year contract extension with the Avalanche.

An impending restricted free agent following the conclusion of his entry-level contract, Martin's tenure with the Avalanche ended after he was not tendered a qualifying offer on June 25, 2019. On the opening day of free agency, Martin agreed to a one-year, two-way contract with the Tampa Bay Lightning on July 1, 2019.

Martin was one of eight players called up to the Lightning for their training camp prior to the 2020 Stanley Cup Playoffs.

On May 3, 2021, Martin signed a one-year, two-way contract extension with the Lightning.

In the following off-season, on July 31, 2021, Martin was traded by the Lightning to the Vancouver Canucks in exchange for future considerations. Martin played 7 games for the AHL's Abbotsford Canucks to begin the 2021–22 campaign, posting a 5–0–2 record with a 2.24 GAA, .921 save percentage and 1 shutout, a 23-save performance against the San Diego Gulls, before being called up to the parent club on January 15 after its backup netminder, Jaroslav Halák, was placed on COVID-19 protocol. Starter Thatcher Demko subsequently tested positive for COVID-19 on January 20. This led to Martin playing in his first NHL game in nearly five years on January 21. Facing the league leading Florida Panthers, Martin turned aside 33 shots in a 2–1 shootout loss and was named the game's first star. He followed this up with a 47-save effort in a 3–2 overtime loss to the Edmonton Oilers on January 25. Martin earned his first NHL win in his following start, stopping 33 shots in a 5–1 victory over the Winnipeg Jets on January 27. He was reassigned  to Abbotsford on January 30 as Demko and Halák returned to play.

Career statistics

Regular season and playoffs

International

Awards and honours

References

External links
 

1995 births
Living people
Abbotsford Canucks players
Canadian ice hockey goaltenders
Colorado Avalanche draft picks
Colorado Avalanche players
Colorado Eagles players
Fort Wayne Komets players
Mississauga St. Michael's Majors players
Mississauga Steelheads players
Orlando Solar Bears (ECHL) players
San Antonio Rampage players
Syracuse Crunch players
Vancouver Canucks players
Ice hockey people from Ontario